Bir Bikrom Hafizuddin Ahmed is a Bangladesh Nationalist Party politician, a retired Bangladesh Army major, and a 6-term Jatiya Sangsad member representing the Bhola-3 constituency. He fought in the Bangladesh Liberation War and was awarded the third highest gallantry award in Bangladesh, the Bir Bikrom, for his courage. He is currently a vice-chairman of the Bangladesh Nationalist Party.

Early life and education
Ahmed's father, Dr. Azharuddin, was a member of the National Council of East Pakistan from Bhola. In 1968, Ahmed received his MA degree in political science from Dhaka University.

Career

Football
Ahmed was a football player during his university days. A striker, he later joined the Mohammedan Sporting Club, in 1964. He remained with the Black and Whites until his retirement in 1978. He won 6 Dhaka League titles with MSC: 1965, 1966, 1969, 1975, 1976, and 1978. He also won two Aga Khan Gold Cup titles with the Black and Whites. In 1976 he led the Mohammedan SC team successfully. He replaced defender Zakaria Pintoo in the job. Mohammedan SC won the Dacca league title defeating arch rivals Abahani in the final 2–0. Hafiz scored both the goals. Mohammedan SC reached the finals of the Aga Khan Gold Cup Football later in the year,  beating Sri-Lanka national team 2–1 in the SF. But they lost to the Penang Football Association Team (Malaysia) 3–0 in the final. That year, Hafiz became the first after independence to score a double hat-trick in the Dhaka League, as Mohammedan defeated Fire Service SC 6–0.

He was selected for the Pakistan national football team in 1967.

Military

Pakistan Army
While playing for the Pakistan and Mohammedan football teams, in 1967, Ahmed was inspired to join the Pakistan Army by the General Secretary of the Pakistan Football Federation, Major Mohammad Hossain Malik. Ahmed applied to join the army's Education Corps, and was commissioned in 1968. He was trained at the Pakistan Military Academy in Kakul, Abbottabad. After being commissioned, he continued his career as a football player and participated in many tournaments. After the 1970 Bhola cyclone, he, as a captain, with Bravo Company, engaged in relief work at Galachipa, Patuakhali.

Role in Bangladesh Liberation War
Ahmed was at Jagdishpur Village in the border area of Jessore as part of a training exercise. He was barred from all type of communication there and had no idea of Operation Searchlight, by Pakistan Army, and the declaration of independence of Bangladesh. He returned to the Jessore Cantonment on 29 March. He learned from his batman that there was an order for the Baloch Regiment to disarm the East Bengal Regiment, and that 25 Baloch Regiment and 3 Frontier Force had taken up positions in front of the cantonment. The arsenal had been broken into by East Bengal non-commissioned officers and soldiers. He joined the Bangladesh Liberation War and asked his commanding officer, Colonel Jalil, to join the war. But Jalil, who maintained contact with M. A. G. Osmani of the Bangladesh Awami League, refused to join the liberation, as Osmani had asked.

During the subsequent battle, Ahmed fought alongside his troops, but realised that the ammunition they had with them would not be enough to last for more than three hours. So, he started thinking about an exit plan. After fighting relentlessly for almost two hours, he finally escaped the cantonment with 200 companions.

In later campaigning, Ahmed, under continuous attack from the Pakistani army, he maintained a free zone at Jessore, including Benapole BOP, from April to mid-May. During the second week of May 1971, Ahmed was ordered to move to Tura, Meghalaya to join the BDF Sector 11 under Major Ziaur Rahman. He was selected to lead the Bravo formation as company commander of 1st East Bengal Regiment in Jessore. He was injured during the Battle of Kamalpur, one of the most significant battles fought by Bangladesh forces in 1971.

Political
Ahmed entered politics as an independent candidate from Bhola. He has been elected as a member of parliament from the Bhola-3 constituency 6 times from 1986 until 2006. He served as the Minister of Water Resources, during the tenure of the second government of Prime Minister Khaleda Zia. Ahmed held several talks with India about the sharing of water. After the reshuffling of the cabinet, he was also appointed as the commerce minister.

Ahmed was detained while protesting the government's decision to repeal the caretaker government system, on 11 June 2011. Again, on 28 December 2013, Ahmed was arrested on the National Press Club premises, when he was leaving there after announcing a new program of demonstrations to be led by his party.

References

Living people
People from Bhola District
Bangladesh Army officers
Bangladeshi footballers
Pakistani footballers
Pakistan international footballers
Mohammedan SC (Dhaka) players
Association football forwards
Recipients of the Bir Bikrom
Recipients of the Bangladesh National Sports Award
3rd Jatiya Sangsad members
4th Jatiya Sangsad members
5th Jatiya Sangsad members
6th Jatiya Sangsad members
7th Jatiya Sangsad members
8th Jatiya Sangsad members
Water Resources ministers
Commerce ministers of Bangladesh
Bangladesh Nationalist Party politicians
1944 births
Mukti Bahini personnel